Henry Norris (or Norreys), 1st Baron Norreys (27 June 1601) of Rycote in Oxfordshire, was an English politician and diplomat, who belonged to an old Berkshire family, many members of which had held positions at the English court.

Origins
He was the son of Sir Henry Norreys (d. 1536), who was beheaded for his supposed adultery with Queen Anne Boleyn, and Mary Fiennes (1495–1531), daughter of Thomas Fiennes, 8th Baron Dacre (1472–1534).

Early career
The early years of Henry's life are obscure. His mother had died in 1531, and his father was beheaded in 1536, leaving him and his younger sister Mary orphans. The children were brought up by their childless uncle, Sir John Norreys. Henry's patrimony was restored to him by an Act of 1539 by King Henry VIII, and in December 1542 his uncle Sir John Norreys of Yattendon, was licensed to settle his estates in reversion on Henry, who was his ward, and on Margery, the younger daughter of John Williams, 1st Baron Williams of Thame, and their heirs. The couple must therefore have been betrothed by this date.

Henry's prospects were bright. He was made a Knight of the Shire for Berkshire in 1547. His wife, Margery, was the coheir of her wealthy father, who had become treasurer of the court of augmentations and who was continuing to acquire land in Berkshire. The deaths of Henry's uncle (1563) and father-in-law (1559) greatly increased Henry's already considerable wealth, bringing him properties in Oxfordshire, where he and his wife settled, and in Berkshire. These included Rycote, Sydenham and Yattendon Castle.

Royal friendship
In 1553, Henry was among the King's gentlemen who witnessed the device settling the crown upon Lady Jane Grey. After the succession crisis, Queen Mary did not hold this act against him, approving his appointment as the butler of Poole later in that same year. In 1554, he was assigned to guard Princess Elizabeth at Woodstock. Elizabeth believed his father had died for his loyalty to her mother, Queen Anne, and brought him and his wife into her trusted circle, where he would stay for the remainder of his life.

In November 1565, on the occasion of the third marriage of Ambrose Dudley, Earl of Warwick, another member of Elizabeth's trusted circle, Henry participated in a tournament in the Queen's presence.

Elizabeth visited the couple at their estate Rycote, Oxfordshire, on numerous occasions; in September 1566 on her return from Oxford, during which she knighted Henry; in 1568, 1570, 1572, and in September 1592, on another journey from Oxford. Upon the death of their son, Sir John Norreys, who was a distinguished soldier in Elizabeth's armies, the queen sent a stately letter of condolence to "my own dear crow", as the Queen still affectionately called Margery.

Later career
In 1561, Norris was made High Sheriff of Oxfordshire and Berkshire. In the autumn of 1566, he was appointed Ambassador to France by the queen. He was recalled in August 1570 and replaced by Sir Francis Walsingham. By way of recompense for his services abroad, he was summoned to the House of Lords, as Baron Norreys of Rycote, on 8 May 1572.

In October 1596, Henry was created Lord Lieutenant of Oxfordshire. He already held the same office for Berkshire.

Marriage and issue
Henry married Margery (or Margaret), (1521 – December 1599), daughter of John Williams, 1st Baron Williams of Thame, sometime between December 1542 and 26 August 1544. They were the parents of seven children. His six sons all distinguished themselves as soldiers.
 Sir John Norreys (1547 – 3 July 1597)
 Sir William Norreys (1548 – 27 December 1579 Ireland)
 Sir Edward Norreys (c. 1550 – October 1603 Englefield), Governor of Ostend in 1590.
 Catherine Norreys (c. 1553 – ), married Sir Anthony Paulet, Governor of the Isle of Jersey about 1583 in Rycote, Oxfordshire. 
 Sir Henry Norreys (1554–1599), fought in the Netherlands and then in Ireland, where he died.
 Sir Thomas Norreys (1556–1599), Lord President of Munster
 Maximilian Norreys (c. 1557 – September 1593), killed in Brittany while serving under his brother, John.

Death and burial
Henry died on 27 June 1601, having outlived his wife and five of his children, and was temporarily buried, on 21 May, in the church at Englefield, where his son Edward was living. Finally, on 5 August, he was re-interred at Rycote, in a vault beneath the chapel of St Michael and All Angels, in the grounds of Rycote House. His will was dated 24 September 1589.

Monument
Both he and his wife are commemorated by the monument erected in honour of them and their six sons in St. Andrew's Chapel in Westminster Abbey. Life-size effigies of Lord and Lady Norreys lie beneath an elaborate canopy supported by marble pillars and they are surrounded by kneeling figures of their children.

Notes

References
 
 
Attribution:

External links

 Sir Henry Norreys (1525–1601) A biography
 Henry Norris, Lord Norris Family tree
 Sir Henry Norreys Find A Grave

1525 births
1601 deaths
Ambassadors of England to France
1
16th-century English diplomats
High Sheriffs of Berkshire
High Sheriffs of Oxfordshire
Lord-Lieutenants of Berkshire
Lord-Lieutenants of Oxfordshire
People from Thame
People from Yattendon
Members of the Parliament of England for Berkshire
Henry, Baron 1st
English MPs 1547–1552
English MPs 1571
English knights
Knights Bachelor
16th-century English nobility